

Converge / Napalm Death is a split EP by American metalcore band Converge and English grindcore band Napalm Death. The album was self-released on August 1, 2012, and features artwork by Converge vocalist Jacob Bannon. It is available on 7" vinyl and as a digital download.

Background

Converge 
Both bands contributed two new tracks to the EP. Converge contributed "No Light Escapes", a song that later appeared on the deluxe edition of their album All We Love We Leave Behind, as well as a cover version of Swedish death metal band Entombed's "Wolverine Blues". The latter features Bannon, Ballou and Newton as well as guests Tomas Lindberg, Aaron Turner, and Kevin Baker all on vocal duties. Due to scheduling issues the band found it easier to record each vocalists duties separately to be edited together later as it is on the original track. The track was described by Converge's distributor Deathwish Inc. as being similar to "We Are the World", a collaborative single from 1985 written by Michael Jackson and Lionel Richie, which featured numerous guest musicians."

On May 23, 2013, Converge self-released the EP, Pound for Pound: The Wolverine Blues Sessions, which was a compilation of the different vocal tracks that comprised its cover of "Wolverine Blues." It featured five songs, each of which had only one of the guest vocalists that were present on the split version, with the exception of Lindberg and Ballou who share a track.

Napalm Death 
Napalm Death contributed "Will by Mouth", which is similar to the band's other material, and "No Impediment to Triumph (Bhopal)", which is a "slower and textural" song about the Bhopal disaster from 1984.

Track listing

Personnel
Taken from liner notes.

Side A

Converge
 Jacob Bannon – lead vocals
 Kurt Ballou – guitars, backing vocals
 Nate Newton – bass, backing vocals
 Ben Koller – drums

Guest vocals on "Wolverine Blues"
 Kevin Baker (The Hope Conspiracy, All Pigs Must Die)
 Brian Izzi (Trap Them)
 Tomas Lindberg (At the Gates, Disfear)
 Aaron Turner (Isis, Old Man Gloom)

Production
 Kurt Ballou – recording, mixing
 Allan Douches – mastering

Side B

Napalm Death
 Mark "Barney" Greenway – vocals
 Mitch Harris – guitars
 Shane Embury – bass
 Danny Herrera – drums

Production
 Napalm Death – production
 James Walford – production, mixing, mastering

Album artwork
 Jacob Bannon – design, photography, illustrations

References

External links
 Converge / Napalm Death at Bandcamp (streamed copy where licensed)
 Pound for Pound: The Wolverine Blues Sessions at Bandcamp (streamed copy where licensed)

Converge (band) albums
Napalm Death albums
Hardcore punk EPs
2012 EPs
Albums with cover art by Jacob Bannon
Albums produced by Kurt Ballou
Split EPs